Syarhey Vasilevich Pyatrukovich (Sergei Vasilyevich Petrukovich; born 29 September 1973) is a former Belarusian football player.

Honours
MTZ-RIPO Minsk
Belarusian Cup winner: 2004–05

References

1973 births
Living people
Belarusian footballers
Belarusian expatriate footballers
Expatriate footballers in Russia
Russian Premier League players
FC Tyumen players
FC BATE Borisov players
FC Shakhtyor Soligorsk players
FC Energetik-BGU Minsk players
FC Darida Minsk Raion players
FC Partizan Minsk players
FC ZLiN Gomel players
Association football midfielders